Oak Shores is a census-designated place in northern San Luis Obispo County, central California.

Geography
Oak Shores is located on the north side of Lake Nacimiento reservoir.

According to the United States Census Bureau, the CDP covers an area of 5.1 square miles (13.1 km), all of it land.

Demographics
The 2010 United States Census reported that Oak Shores had a population of 337. The racial makeup of Oak Shores was 318 (94.4%) White, 3 (0.9%) African American, 2 (0.6%) Native American, 4 (1.2%) Asian, 0 (0.0%) Pacific Islander, 4 (1.2%) from other races, and 6 (1.8%) from two or more races. Hispanic or Latino of any race were 31 persons (9.2%).

The Census reported that 337 people (100% of the population) lived in households, 0 (0%) lived in non-institutionalized group quarters, and 0 (0%) were institutionalized.

There were 157 households, out of which 26 (16.6%) had children under the age of 18 living in them, 90 (57.3%) were opposite-sex married couples living together, 7 (4.5%) had a female householder with no husband present, 4 (2.5%) had a male householder with no wife present.  There were 11 (7.0%) unmarried opposite-sex partnerships, and 1 (0.6%) same-sex married couples or partnerships. 41 households (26.1%) were made up of individuals, and 16 (10.2%) had someone living alone who was 65 years of age or older. The average household size was 2.15.  There were 101 families (64.3% of all households); the average family size was 2.53.

The population was spread out, with 51 people (15.1%) under the age of 18, 10 people (3.0%) aged 18 to 24, 78 people (23.1%) aged 25 to 44, 117 people (34.7%) aged 45 to 64, and 81 people (24.0%) who were 65 years of age or older.  The median age was 50.6 years. For every 100 females there were 106.7 males.  For every 100 females age 18 and over, there were 105.8 males.

The homeowner vacancy rate was 4.7%; the rental vacancy rate was 2.7%.  243 people (72.1% of the population) lived in owner-occupied housing units and 94 people (27.9%) lived in rental housing units.

References

Census-designated places in San Luis Obispo County, California
Santa Lucia Range